Dream of the Red Chamber, first released in 1987, is a television series produced by CCTV adapted from the classic 18th century Chinese novel Dream of the Red Chamber. It gained enormous popularity for its music, cast, and plot adaptation. It was first filmed in Beijing in Mandarin, then the series was dubbed in Cantonese and Shanghainese. The series is 36 episodes long.

The TV series is regarded by many within China as being a near-definitive adaptation of the novel. A TV remake of the novel started airing in 2010; however, much objection was raised over the unorthodox costume design and other contested interpretations.

Plot summary 
The series follows the plot of Cao Xueqin's novel Dream of the Red Chamber. The series begins with the mother-less child, Lin Daiyu - whose beauty and intelligence surpasses all - moving into the family compound of her maternal grandmother in the capital. There, the child meets numerous relatives, one of whom is Jia Baoyu, her mother's nephew and male protagonist. Baoyu was born with a piece of jade in his mouth and, so, is treated like a fragile egg and spoiled by his grandmother. He often spends his time with his female cousins and maids instead of tending to his studies. In addition to Daiyu, one of the cousins he spends time with the most is the tactful Xue Baochai.

As the story goes on, Baoyu and Daiyu eventually fall in love with each other, but Daiyu is not very well liked by the family and, instead, the family members favor Baochai. Eventually, Baoyu and Baochai are forced to marry, and Daiyu dies of a broken heart. The series ends with the Emperor confiscating the Jia family properties and the family members scattered, some to their own tragic end.  While some of the members do eventually reunite, Baoyu leaves to become a monk.

Episodes 
The serial contains 36 episodes spanning the novel.

1. Daiyu Parted With Her Father and Went to the Capital (林黛玉别父进京都)
2. Baoyu, Daiyu, and Baochai's First Meeting at the Hall of Glorious Pageant (宝黛钗初会荣庆堂)
3. Granny Liu Pays Her First Visit to the Jung Mansion (刘姥姥一进荣国府)
4. Daiyu Feels Slight Jealous While meeting Baoyu at Baochai's Home (探宝钗黛玉半含酸)
5. Xifeng Sets a Vicious Trap for a Lover (王熙凤毒设相思局)
6. Xifeng Helps to Manage Affairs at the Ning Mansion (王熙凤协理宁国府)
7. Literary Talent Tested By Composing Inscriptions for Grandview Garden (大观园试才题对额)
8. Jung Mansion Had the Imperial Consort's Visitation on the Lantern Festival (荣国府归省庆元宵)
9. A Sweet Girl Shows Deep Feeling One Quiet Day (意绵绵静日玉生香)
10. A Song Awakes Baoyu to Esoteric Truths (听曲文宝玉悟禅机)
11. Meeting a Nightmare In Seeking After Favor (为争宠姐弟遭魔魇)
12. Daiyu Weeps at Falling Petals (埋香冢飞燕泣残红)
13. The Fortune Enjoys Deep Fortune and Long Life (享福人福深还祷福)
14. Chin-chuan Dies a Heroic Death in Shame (含耻辱情烈死金钏)
15. Baoyu Was Beaten For Flirting (弄唇舌宝玉遭笞挞)
16. Granny Liu Pays a Visit to Grandview Garden (刘姥姥嬉游大观园)
17. Xifeng Taken by Surprise Gives Ways to Jealousy (变生不测凤姐泼醋)
18. Yuanyang Vows Never to Marry (鸳鸯女誓绝鸳鸯偶)
19. White Snow and Red Plum-Blossum in the Glassy World (琉璃世界白雪红梅)
20. Plucky Qingwen Mends a Peacock-Feather Cape in Bed (勇晴雯病补雀金裘)
21. An Evening Banquet on the Lantern Festival in the Jung Mansion (荣国府元宵开夜宴)
22. Ping'er Wields Authority to Right a Wrong (判冤决狱平儿行权)
23. Artful Zijuan Tests Baoyu's Feelings (慧紫鹃情辞试忙玉)
24. Girls Feast at Night in Happy Red Court (寿怡红群芳开夜宴)
25. The Profligate Secretly Takes Second Sister Yu as a Concubine (贾二舍偷娶尤二姨)
26. Xifeng in Jealousy Makes a Scene in the Ning Mansion (酸凤姐大闹宁国府)
27. Lady Xing Feels Wronged and Puts Xifeng in Wrong (嫌隙人有心生嫌隙)
28. Strange Omen Occurs at Night Banquet (开夜宴异兆发悲音)
29. Spoony Childe Writes a Dirge on Cottonrose Hibiscus (痴公子杜撰芙蓉诔)
30. Drifting Away of Fair Maidens From Grandview Garden (大观园诸芳流散)
31. Spiritual Jade Was Stolen During a Bustling Feast (家宅乱误窃通灵)
32. Grieving Over Tanchun's Departure to Marry Far from Home (伤离别探春远嫁)
33. Daiyu Is Shocked by Bade News and Dies (惊噩耗黛玉魂归)
34. Forced Xifeng Resigned Herself to a Fate Spread East of Bed-Curtain (强英雄凤姐知命)
35. Collapsed Mansion Comes to an End (大厦倾公府末路)
36. A Vast and White Expanse of Immerse Universe (白茫茫厚地高天)

Cast 
Ouyang Fenqiang as Jia Baoyu
Chen Xiaoxu as Lin Daiyu
Zhang Li as Xue Baochai
Cheng Mei as Jia Yuanchun
Dongfang Wenying as Jia Tanchun
Guo Xiaozhen as Shi Xiangyun
Ji Yu (former name Ji Peijie) as Miaoyu
Deng Jie as Wang Xifeng
Jin Lili as Jia Yingchun
Zhang Lei as Qin Keqing
Shen Ling as Ping'er
An Wen (former name Zhang Jinglin) as Qingwen
Yuan Mei as Xiren
Gao Liang as Jia Lian
Zhou Xianzhen as Lady Wang
Wu Xiaodong as Jia Yun
Yang Junyong as Jia Rong

Accolades

Reception and soundtrack
The 1987 series was initially somewhat controversial as few Redologists believed a TV adaptation could do the novel full justice. Producer and director Wang Fulin's decision in employing non-professional youths was vindicated as the TV series gained enormous popularity in China.

The series' success owes much to composer Wang Liping (王立平). He set many of the novel's classical verses to music, taking as long as four years to deliberate and complete his compositions.

External links 
 Dream of Red Mansions, CNTV online complete video, free and legal streaming (Chinese)
 'A Dream of Red Mansions TV Serial by CCTV (DVD)'
 

Works based on Dream of the Red Chamber
China Central Television
1987 Chinese television series debuts
Chinese romance television series
Television series set in Imperial China
1980s Chinese television series
Mandarin-language television shows
1980s romance television series